Tomasz Swędrowski (born 25 November 1993) is a Polish professional footballer who plays as a midfielder for Ruch Chorzów. He has previously played professionally for Warta Sieradz, MKS Kluczbork, Stal Mielec, Bytovia Bytów and Motor Lublin.

Club career
Swędrowski began his football career at Warta Sieradz, making his first team debut on 13 March 2010 at age 16, coming on as a 76th-minute substitute. In January 2012, he joined II liga club MKS Kluczbork, and made his professional debut on 17 March 2012 in a 2–1 away win against Elana Toruń In his fourth season Swędrowski made 31 league appearances for MKS, scoring five goals, and helping them win promotion to I liga.

In June 2017, Swędrowski joined I liga side Stal Mielec. He spent one-and-a-half years with Stal, and featured primarily as a substitute. In January 2019, he signed a half-year contract with Bytovia Bytów

On 18 July 2019, Swędrowski moved to Motor Lublin.

On 2 June 2022, it was announced he would join freshly promoted I liga side Ruch Chorzów on a two-year deal.

References

External links
 

1993 births
Living people
Polish footballers
Association football midfielders
MKS Kluczbork players
Stal Mielec players
Bytovia Bytów players
Motor Lublin players
Ruch Chorzów players
I liga players
II liga players
III liga players